2002 census may refer to:

Polish census of 2002
Russian Census (2002)
Tanzanian census (2002)